N38 may refer to:
 Escadrille N.38, a unit of the French Air Force
 , a submarine of the Royal Navy
 London Buses route N38
 Nebraska Highway 38, in the United States
 Negeri Sembilan State Route N38, in Malaysia
 Northrop N-38, an American protoype aircraft
 Wellsboro Johnston Airport, serving Wellsboro, Pennsylvania, United States